The Barkin House is a historic house located at 84 East Olive Street in Long Beach, Nassau County, New York.

Description and history 
It was built in 1946-1947 by William Barkin, and is a multi-story International Style, stuccoed concrete block dwelling with a flat roof. It consists of a three-bay wide, two-story section, an entry bay, and a three-bay wide, one-story section. The house features sun porches with tubular metal railing and playful nautical touches.

It was listed on the National Register of Historic Places on May 18, 2015.

References

Houses on the National Register of Historic Places in New York (state)
International style architecture in New York (state)
Houses completed in 1947
Houses in Nassau County, New York
National Register of Historic Places in Nassau County, New York